Tereapii (Apii) Piho (born 25 August 1960) is a Cook Islands politician and former Cabinet Minister.

Piho was born on Rakahanga and educated in New Zealand.  He was first elected to Parliament for the seat of Manihiki as a member of the Cook Islands Democratic Party at the 2006 election, defeating Cook Islands Party leader Henry Puna.

In December 2009 he was appointed to Cabinet following the sacking of Terepai Maoate and resignation of Democratic party cabinet ministers. holding the portfolios of Justice, Health, Internal Affairs, Youth & Sports, and NGOs.  As a result, he was expelled from the Democratic Party on 8 April 2010.

Piho failed to win re-election in the 2010 election and was defeated by Henry Puna.

References

External links
 Profile at Cook Islands Parliament.

Living people
Members of the Parliament of the Cook Islands
1960 births
People from Manihiki
Democratic Party (Cook Islands) politicians
Health ministers of the Cook Islands
Interior ministers of the Cook Islands
Justice ministers of the Cook Islands